Ruth Gilfillan (born 6 March 1967) is a British swimmer. Gilfillan competed in two events at the 1988 Summer Olympics. She won the 1987 and 1991 ASA National Championship 200 metres freestyle titles  and the 1987, 1988 and 1991 ASA National Championship 400 metres freestyle titles.

References

External links
 

1967 births
Living people
British female freestyle swimmers
Olympic swimmers of Great Britain
Swimmers at the 1988 Summer Olympics
Sportspeople from Glasgow
Commonwealth Games medallists in swimming
Commonwealth Games bronze medallists for Scotland
Swimmers at the 1986 Commonwealth Games
Medallists at the 1986 Commonwealth Games
Scottish female freestyle swimmers